In the mathematical field of differential geometry, the Gauss–Bonnet theorem (or Gauss–Bonnet formula) is a fundamental formula which links the curvature of a surface to its underlying topology.

In the simplest application, the case of a triangle on a plane, the sum of its angles is 180 degrees. The Gauss–Bonnet theorem extends this to more complicated shapes and curved surfaces, connecting the local and global geometries.

The theorem is named after Carl Friedrich Gauss, who developed a version but never published it, and Pierre Ossian Bonnet, who published a special case in 1848.

Statement 
Suppose  is a compact two-dimensional Riemannian manifold with boundary . Then

If the boundary  is piecewise smooth, then we interpret the integral  as the sum of the corresponding integrals along the smooth portions of the boundary, plus the sum of the angles by which the smooth portions turn at the corners of the boundary.

Many standard proofs use the theorem of turning tangents, which states roughly that the winding number of a Jordan curve is exactly ±1.

A simple example 

Suppose  is the northern hemisphere cut out from a sphere of radius . Its Euler characteristic is 1. Then .

On the other hand, suppose we flatten the hemisphere to make it into a disk. This transformation is an homeomorphism, so the Euler characteristic is still 1. Then .

Finally, take a sphere octant, also homoemorphic to the previous cases. Then . Now  almost everywhere along the border, which is a geodesic triangle. But we have three right-angle corners, so .

Interpretation and significance
The theorem applies in particular to compact surfaces without boundary, in which case the integral 

can be omitted. It states that the total Gaussian curvature of such a closed surface is equal to 2 times the Euler characteristic of the surface. Note that for orientable compact surfaces without boundary, the Euler characteristic equals , where  is the genus of the surface: Any orientable compact surface without boundary is topologically equivalent to a sphere with some handles attached, and  counts the number of handles.

If one bends and deforms the surface , its Euler characteristic, being a topological invariant, will not change, while the curvatures at some points will. The theorem states, somewhat surprisingly, that the total integral of all curvatures will remain the same,  no matter how the deforming is done. So for instance if you have a sphere with a "dent", then its total curvature is 4 (the Euler characteristic of a sphere being 2), no matter how big or deep the dent.

Compactness of the surface is of crucial importance. Consider for instance the open unit disc, a non-compact Riemann surface without boundary, with curvature 0 and with Euler characteristic 1: the Gauss–Bonnet formula does not work. It holds true however for the compact closed unit disc, which also has Euler characteristic 1, because of the added boundary integral with value 2.

As an application, a torus has Euler characteristic 0, so its total curvature must also be zero. It is also possible to construct a torus by identifying opposite sides of a square, in which case the Riemannian metric on the torus is flat and has constant curvature 0, again resulting in total curvature 0. It is not possible to specify a Riemannian metric on the torus with everywhere positive or everywhere negative Gaussian curvature.

For triangles 
Sometimes the Gauss–Bonnet formula is stated as

 

where  is a geodesic triangle. We can then apply GB to the surface  formed by the inside of that triangle and the piecewise boundary of the triangle.

The geodesic curvature the bordering geodesics is 0, and the Euler characteristic of  being 1.

Hence the sum of the turning angles of the geodesic triangle is equal to 2 minus the total curvature within the triangle. Since the turning angle at a corner is equal to  minus the interior angle, we can rephrase this as follows:

 The sum of interior angles of a geodesic triangle is equal to  plus the total curvature enclosed by the triangle: 

In the case of the plane (where the Gaussian curvature is 0 and geodesics are straight lines), we recover the familiar formula for the sum of angles in an ordinary triangle.

Special cases 
A number of earlier results in spherical geometry and hyperbolic geometry, discovered over the preceding centuries, were subsumed as special cases of Gauss–Bonnet.

Triangles 
In spherical trigonometry and hyperbolic trigonometry, the area of a triangle is proportional to the amount by which its interior angles fail to add up to 180°, or equivalently by the (inverse) amount by which its exterior angles fail to add up to 360°.

The area of a spherical triangle is proportional to its excess, by Girard's theorem – the amount by which its interior angles add up to more than 180°, which is equal to the amount by which its exterior angles add up to less than 360°.

The area of a hyperbolic triangle, conversely is proportional to its defect, as established by Johann Heinrich Lambert.

Polyhedra 

Descartes' theorem on total angular defect of a polyhedron is the polyhedral analog:
it states that the sum of the defect at all the vertices of a polyhedron which is homeomorphic to the sphere is 4. This is the special case of Gauss–Bonnet, where the curvature is concentrated at discrete points (the vertices).

Thinking of curvature as a measure, rather than as a function, Descartes' theorem is Gauss–Bonnet where the curvature is a discrete measure, and Gauss–Bonnet for measures generalizes both Gauss–Bonnet for smooth manifolds and Descartes' theorem.

Combinatorial analog
There are several combinatorial analogs of the Gauss–Bonnet theorem. We state the following one. Let  be a finite 2-dimensional pseudo-manifold. Let  denote the number of triangles containing the vertex . Then

Similar formulas can be obtained for 2-dimensional pseudo-manifold when we replace triangles with higher polygons.
For example, for quadrilaterals we must replace 3 and 6 in the formula above with 2 and 4, respectively. More specifically, if  is a closed 2-dimensional digital manifold, the genus turns out 

where  indicates the number of surface-points each of which has  adjacent points on the surface. This is the simplest formula of Gauss–Bonnet theorem in three-dimensional digital space.

Generalizations
The Chern theorem (after Shiing-Shen Chern 1945) is the -dimensional generalization of GB (also see Chern–Weil homomorphism).

The Riemann–Roch theorem can also be seen as a generalization of GB to complex manifolds.

A far-reaching generalization that includes all the abovementioned theorems is the Atiyah–Singer index theorem.

A generalization to 2-manifolds that need not be compact is  Cohn-Vossen's inequality.

In popular culture

In Greg Egan's novel Diaspora, two characters discuss the derivation of this theorem.

The theorem can be used directly as a system to control sculpture. For example, in work by Edmund Harriss in the collection of the University of Arkansas Honors College.

See also 
Chern–Gauss–Bonnet theorem
Atiyah–Singer index theorem

References

Further reading

External links
Gauss–Bonnet Theorem at Wolfram Mathworld

Theorems in differential geometry
Riemann surfaces